Agabus brunneus, the brown diving beetle, is a species of water beetle in the family Dytiscidae.

Description

Distribution
The species lives in streams, mainly in Portreath (Portreath Stream), New Forest, and Dorset (in River Frome).

References

brunneus
Beetles of Europe
Beetles described in 1768
Taxa named by Johan Christian Fabricius